Nicrophorus distinctus is a burying beetle described by A.H. Grouvelle in 1885.

References

Silphidae
Beetles of North America
Beetles described in 1885